The Ernst Jung Prize is a prize awarded annually for excellence in biomedical sciences.  The Ernst Jung Foundation, funded by Hamburg merchant Ernst Jung in 1967, has awarded the Ernst Jung Prize in Medicine, now €300,000, since 1976, and the lifetime achievement Ernst Jung Gold Medal for Medicine since 1990.

Ernst Jung Prize for Medicine 
Source: Jung Foundation

1976: Donald Henderson and Lorenz Zimmerman
1977:  and John B. West
1979: Karl Lennert and 
1980: , Alan Parks and 
1981: David E. Kuhl
1982: Hartmut Wekerle and Rolf M. Zinkernagel
1983:  and Richard Lower
1984: , Werner Franke and Klaus Weber
1985: Hendrik Coenraad Hemker, Rudolf Pichlmayr and Peter K. Vogt
1986: Albrecht Fleckenstein
1987: Peter Richardson and 
1988: Helmut Sies and Charles Weissmann
1989:  and Jon van Rood
1990: Gerhard Giebisch and 
1991: David Ho and 
1992: Roy Yorke Calne and 
1993: Charles A. Dinarello and Robert Machemer
1994:  and Wolf Singer
1995: Anthony Fauci and 
1996: Harald zur Hausen and 
1997: Francis V. Chisari,  and Judah Folkman
1998: Alain Fischer
1999:  and 
2000: Martin J. Lohse and Peter H. Krammer
2001: Christine Petit and 
2002:  and Christian Haass
2003: Ari Helenius and 
2004:  and Tobias Bonhoeffer
2005:  and Franz-Ulrich Hartl
2006: Reinhard Jahn and 
2007: , Stefanie Dimmeler and Josef Penninger
2008: ,  and Thomas Tuschl
2009:  and Patrick Cramer
2010: Stephen G. Young and Peter Carmeliet
2011: Hans Clevers and 
2012: Peter Walter and Elisa Izaurralde 
2013: Angelika Amon and Ivan Đikić
2014: 
2015: Emmanuelle Charpentier
2016: Hans-Georg Rammensee
2017:  and Nenad Ban
2018: Ruth Ley and Marco Prinz
2019: Brenda A. Schulman and Gary R. Lewin
2020: Matthias Tschöp
2021: Christian Hertweck
2022: Ralf Bartenschlager and

Ernst Jung Gold Medal for Medicine 
Source: Jung Foundation

1990: Beatrice Mintz 
1991: 
1992: 
1993: Robert Daroff
1994: 
1995: Friedrich Stelzner
1996: 
1997:  and 
1998: 
1999: 
2000: 
2001: Gustav Born
2002: 
2003: 
2004: 
2005: 
2006: 
2007: Hans Thoenen
2008: 
2009: 
2010: Klaus Rajewsky 
2011: Michel Lazdunski
2012: 
2013: Salvador Moncada
2014: Charles Weissmann 
2015: 
2016: Peter Libby
2017: Pascale Cossart
2018: Wolfgang Baumeister
2019: Pietro De Camilli
2021: Antonio Lanzavecchia
2022: Alain Fischer

See also

 List of medicine awards

References

External links
 

German science and technology awards
Medicine awards